Suzan Sabancı Dinçer, CBE (born 1965), is a Turkish businesswoman and a member of the Sabancı family in third generation. She is currently chairperson of Akbank, as well as board member of Sabancı Holding.

Career
Suzan Sabancı Dinçer is the Chairman of Akbank. Sabancı Dinçer is also a board member of Sabancı Holding and a member of the Board of Trustees of Sabancı University. In 2009, Sabancı Dinçer founded the Akbank International Advisory Board and currently serves as its chairman.

Suzan Sabancı Dinçer began her career in banking in 1986 and joined Akbank as Executive Vice President in charge of Treasury in 1989. In 1997, she was named Executive Board Member for Treasury and International Banking Relations. Sabancı Dinçer was appointed as Executive Board Member to oversee the bank-wide change and transition program in 2001. She was named Chairman in March, 2008.

Education

Suzan Sabancı Dinçer holds a B.A. degree in Finance and International Marketing from Richmond, The American International University in London, UK and an MBA degree from Boston University, US.

Memberships

Sabancı Dinçer is a member of the Institute of International Finance Board of Directors and Emerging Markets Advisory Board, Harvard University’s Global Advisory Council, Harvard Business School’s Global Leaders Circle, Harvard Kennedy School Mossavar-Rahmani Center for Business and Government’s Advisory Council and an emeritus member of the Harvard Business School’s Middle East and North Africa Advisory Board. Suzan Sabancı Dinçer is also a member of the Global Board of Advisors at the Council on Foreign Relations (CFR), and a member of the Board of Managing Directors of Venetian Heritage, Inc.

From 2010 to 2014, Suzan Sabancı Dinçer served as the chairman of the Turkish-British Business Council for two terms. From 2009 to 2016, Sabancı Dinçer sat on the Global Board of Advisors of Chatham House. In 2012, Queen Elizabeth II awarded Sabancı Dinçer the title of "Commander of the Most Excellent Order of the British Empire (CBE)" in recognition of her proactive and influential contributions to the development of Turkey-UK relations.

Suzan Sabancı Dinçer is strongly committed to corporate social responsibility activities and assumes various positions in the fields of culture, education, and the promotion of entrepreneurship. She is a founding member and board member of the leading high-impact entrepreneurship movement, Endeavor Turkey, and a member of the board of patrons of the Contemporary Istanbul Art Fair. Sabancı Dinçer is also Luxembourg’s Honorary Consul in Istanbul. In 2014, Sabancı Dinçer was given the Order of Civil Merit (Orden del Mérito Civil) of the Kingdom of Spain by King Felipe VI for her contributions to the relations between the two countries and for her support to the cultural convergence.

Personal life
Sabancı Dinçer is married with two children.

References

Suzan Sabanci Dincer
Living people
1965 births
Boston University School of Management alumni
Turkish chief executives
Turkish bankers
Turkish women in business
Turkish businesspeople
Turkish billionaires
Date of birth missing (living people)
Honorary Commanders of the Order of the British Empire